Zachary Green (born April 29, 1994) is an American professional wrestler. He is best known for his time in WWE, where he performed on the NXT brand under the ring name  Nash Carter and in Impact Wrestling under the ring name Zachary Wentz (or simply Wentz).  He is well known as a member of The Rascalz with Dezmond Xavier and Trey Miguel. He also performed on independent promotions, mostly notably for Pro Wrestling Guerrilla (PWG).

Green began his career in 2014 and worked for several independent promotions. During his first years, he joined Dezmond Xavier and Trey Miguel to create a stable called The Rascalz. During their time together, he won several tag team titles, like the AAW Tag Team Championship, the CZW World Tag Team Championship or the PWG World Tag Team Championship. He also became CZW Wired Championship. In 2018, The Rascalz joined Impact Wrestling, where they stayed until 2020 when he and Xavier signed with WWE and were assigned to their development brand, NXT. They changed their ringnames to Nash Carter and Wes Lee and their tag team was renamed MSK. They would win the Dusty Rhodes Tag Team Classic in 2021 and won the NXT Tag Team Championship twice.

Professional wrestling career

Independent circuit (2014–2020) 
Dezmond Xavier and Zachary Wentz teamed with each other for the first time at a Rockstar Pro event Amped on December 12, 2015 by defeating Ohio Is 4 Killers (Dave Crist and Jake Crist). They soon formed an alliance with Dave Crist, JT Davidson and Brittany Blake called Scarlet And Graves at a Combat Zone Wrestling event Seventeen on February 13, 2016 by defeating Conor Claxton, Frankie Pickard and Neiko Sozio. Xavier and Wentz won many tag team titles as part of the stable including the CZW World Tag Team Championship twice and the All American Wrestling Tag Team Championship once. In CZW, they split up from Dave Crist and JT Davidson, with whom Xavier and Wentz had begun feuding and continued to compete as Scarlet And Graves. Xavier and Wentz teamed with their future partner Trey Miguel for the first time to defeat Ohio Is 4 Killers (Dave Crist, Jake Crist and Sami Callihan) in a doors match at EVILution on July 8, 2017.

Scarlet and Graves dissolved in 2017 and Xavier and Wentz formed a tag team called The Rascalz in Fight Club Pro by teaming with Meiko Satomura against Travis Banks and Aussie Open in a six-person tag team match at the second day of the Dream Tag Team Invitational tournament on March 31, 2018.

Xavier and Wentz then added Trey Miguel and Myron Reed as the new members of Rascalz in CZW at Welcome to the Combat Zone on April 7, 2018. They defeated Bandido and Flamita and Ohio Versus Everything in a three-way match. At FCP's International Tekkers: Nothing Is True, Everything Is Permitted, Xavier and Wentz captured The Wrestling Revolver's PWR Tag Team Championship by defeating the defending champions Millie McKenzie and Pete Dunne and The Besties In The World (Davey Vega and Mat Fitchett) in a three-way match. They successfully defended the titles in a one-night tag team tournament against Killer Death Machines (Jessicka Havok and Nevaeh), The Crew (Jason Cade and Shane Strickland) and The Latin American Exchange (Santana and Ortiz) at Catalina Wrestling Mixer 2. Miguel and Reed also participated in the tournament, losing to Besties in the World in the opening round. Rascalz held the PWR Tag Team Championship until It's Always Sunny In Iowa on March 3, 2019, where they lost the titles to Latin American Exchange in a three-way match, also involving Besties in the World. Reed would leave the group after Miguel, Xavier and Wentz signed with Impact Wrestling.

On May 12, Miguel and Wentz won the WC Big Top Tag Team Championship at WrestleCircus event Encore by defeating The Dirty Devils (Andy Dalton and Isaiah James) and The Riegel Twins (Logan and Sterling) in a three-way match. After a successful title defense against Riegel Twins and Private Party at Big Top Revival, Miguel and Wentz vacated the titles on July 25. In the United Kingdom-based Southside Wrestling Entertainment, Xavier and Wentz captured the SWE Tag Team Championship by defeating Chris Tyler and Stixx at III Manors on August 10. They lost the titles to Deadly Sins at Lock, Stock And Three Smoking Rascalz.

Dezmond Xavier and Zachary Wentz debuted for Pro Wrestling Guerrilla (PWG) at Time is a Flat Circle on March 23, 2018 by defeating Bandido and Flamita in a tag team match. The following month, during the night one of All Star Weekend on April 20, Rascalz defeated The Chosen Bros (Jeff Cobb and Matt Riddle) and The Young Bucks in a three-way match to capture the World Tag Team Championship. Rascalz made their first successful title defense the following night against Violence Unlimited. Rascalz would retain the titles throughout the rest of 2018 and 2019 as they successfully defended the titles against Young Bucks, Lucha Brothers, Latin American Exchange and Best Friends in quick succession. At Two Hundred, Rascalz retained the title against LAX and Lucha Brothers in a three-way match. They successfully defended the titles against Flamita and Rey Horus at Mystery Vortex VI and LAX in a ladder match at Sixteen.
In 2021, after Xavier and Wentz signed with WWE, PWG vacated the titles and crowned new tag team champions. The Rascalz are the longest reigning PWG World Tag Team Champions in history.

Impact Wrestling (2018–2020) 
The Rascalz signed with Impact Wrestling in the fall of 2018. Dezmond Xavier had already worked for Impact, having won the Super X Cup tournament the previous year. Zachary Wentz and Trey Miguel made their first appearance in Impact by teaming with Ace Austin as enhancement talents against oVe (Dave Crist, Jake Crist and Sami Callihan) in a losing effort on the September 6 episode of Impact!. A vignette aired promoting the debut of Rascalz on the November 15 episode of Impact!. Rascalz made their debut as a fan favorite team on the November 29 episode of Impact! as Xavier and Wentz defeated Chris Bey and Mike Sydal. Miguel was in their corner for the match. Rascalz began their feud against Moose in 2019, which led to Rascalz making their pay-per-view debut against Moose and The North in a six-man tag team match at Rebellion, which Rascalz lost. During the match, the ring names of Xavier, Miguel and Wentz were shortened to Dez, Trey and Wentz respectively.

Dez and Wentz would lose to North at Code Red. The Rascalz would then go on to defeat oVe members Dave Crist, Jake Crist and Madman Fulton at A Night You Can't Mist. On the June 7 episode of Impact Wrestling, Dez and Wentz received their first opportunity for the World Tag Team Championship against The Latin American Exchange (Santana and Ortiz), which they lost via disqualification after Wentz interfered in the match. This led to a rematch between the two teams for the titles at Slammiversary XVII. On the July 5 episode of Impact Wrestling, Dez and Wentz defeated Trey in a three-way match to earn the right to be LAX's opponents at Slammiversary. In the meanwhile, LAX lost the titles to The North, which led to North being added into the match, making it a three-way match for the titles, where North retained the titles. Rascalz would then defeat Andy Dalton, Matthew Palmer and Steve O Reno at Bash at the Brewery.

In 2020, at Slammiversary, The Rascalz, represented by Dez and Wentz, issued an open challenge to any tag team. The reunited Motor City Machine Guns accepted the challenge and won the match. Trey challenged for the vacant Impact World Championship in the main event. However, the match was won by Eddie Edwards.

On November 11, it was revealed that The Rascalz would be leaving Impact amid interest from both WWE and All Elite Wrestling. During the November 17 tapings, The Rascalz were given a "send off" by the Impact locker room. Trey confirmed the following day that he, Dez and Wentz were in fact finished with Impact Wrestling. However, since then, Trey Miguel has made his return to IMPACT, effectively ending The Rascalz as a trio.

WWE (2020–2022) 
On December 2, 2020, Green signed a contract with WWE and was assigned to the WWE Performance Center. On the January 13, 2021 episode of NXT, Wentz, now going by the ring name Nash Carter, and his tag team partner Dezmond Xavier, now going by the ring name Wes Lee, debuted under the new team name MSK. They would debut in the Men's Dusty Rhodes Tag Team Classic tournament, which they would go on to eventually win. At NXT Takeover: Stand & Deliver, MSK defeated Grizzled Young Veterans and Legado Del Fantasma in a triple threat tag team match to win the vacant NXT Tag Team Championship. MSK would have their first successful title defense against the team of Killian Dain and Drake Marverick on the April 13 episode of NXT. At NXT Takeover: In Your House, MSK would team with NXT North American Champion, Bronson Reed to take on Legado Del Fantasma in a winners take all match, where the team of MSK and Reed would be successful. At NXT: The Great American Bash, MSK would defeat Tommaso Ciampa and Timothy Thatcher to retain their NXT Tag Team Titles.  On the September 8 episode of NXT, MSK would defeat Oney Lorcan and Danny Burch to retain the NXT Tag Team Titles. On the October 5 episode of NXT 2.0, MSK would successfully defend their Tag Titles in a fatal-4-way elimination match. At NXT: Halloween Havoc, MSK would lose their titles to Imperium, ending their reign at 201 days. At NXT Stand & Deliver, MSK would win the NXT Tag Team Championships for the second time, defeating Imperium and The Creed Brothers in a triple threat tag team match. Four days later however, on April 6, 2022, Green would be released from WWE following allegations by his ex-wife Kimber Lee and the leaking of a picture of Green imitating Adolf Hitler (see personal life), and shortly after, the Championships were officially vacated.

Nash Carter was scheduled to be a DLC character in WWE 2K22, but 2K removed him from the DLC roster due to his release and allegations.

Return to the independent circuit (2022-present) 
On June 9, it was announced that the Rascalz would be reforming with Miguel, Carter and Reed, facing the team of Blake Christian, Nick Wayne and Fuego Del Sol at Warrior Wrestling 24 on June 26 only to be replaced by Dante Leon.

Personal life and allegations 
Green was in a relationship with fellow wrestler Kimber Lee that began in 2018. The couple got engaged in August 2019 and married the following year, in May 2020. Following their separation in 2022, Lee made allegations that Green had domestically assaulted her over a period of time. Shortly after these allegations, a photo was posted by Lee showing Green performing a Nazi salute with a moustache similar to that of Adolf Hitler, which led to him being released by WWE.

Wentz has been in a relationship with Gigi Dolin since his separation from Lee

Championships and accomplishments 
 All American Wrestling
 AAW Tag Team Championship (1 time) – with Dezmond Xavier
 Combat Zone Wrestling
 CZW World Tag Team Championship (2 times) – with Dezmond Xavier
 CZW Wired Championship (1 time)
 Pro Wrestling Guerrilla
 PWG World Tag Team Championship (1 time) – with Dezmond Xavier
Revolution Pro Wrestling
SWE Tag Team Championship (1 time) – with Dezmond Xavier
Rockstar Pro Wrestling
American Luchacore Championship (2 times)
Rockstar Pro Championship (1 time)
Rockstar Pro Trios Championship (1 time) – with Clayton Jackson and Myron Reed
The Wrestling Revolver
PWR Tag Team Championship (1 time) – with Dezmond Xavier
One Night Tag Team Tournament (2018) – with Dezmond Xavier
 Pro Wrestling Illustrated
Ranked No. 331 of the top 500 singles wrestlers in the PWI 500 in 2021
WrestleCircus
WC Big Top Tag Team Championship (1 time) – Trey Miguel
 WWE
NXT Tag Team Championship (2 times) – with Wes Lee
 Men's Dusty Rhodes Tag Team Classic (2021) – with Wes Lee
 Xtreme Intense Championship Wrestling
 XICW Tag Team Championship (1 time) – with Aaron Williams, Dave Crist, Kyle Maverick, Trey Miguel, and Dezmond Xavier

References

External links 

 
 
 
 
 Impact Wrestling Profile

Living people
1994 births
American male professional wrestlers
Professional wrestlers from Ohio
Sportspeople from Dayton, Ohio
NXT Tag Team Champions
PWG World Tag Team Champions
CZW Wired Champions
AAW Tag Team Champions